The Camellia Bowl was a post-season major college football bowl game played at McNaspy Stadium in Lafayette, Louisiana, on December 30, 1948, between the Hardin–Simmons Cowboys and the Wichita Shockers (now known as Wichita State).

Background
The Cowboys were from the Border Conference in their third bowl game of 1948 (a tie to Pacific 35–35 in the Grape Bowl December 11, and a defeat of Ouachita College 40–12 in the Shrine Bowl a week later). Wichita was second place in the Missouri Valley Conference in their first bowl game.

Game summary
The Hardin-Simmons Cowboys outrushed and simply overmanned the Shockers, beating them soundly 49–12. The bowl was never played again due to the low attendance.

See also
List of college bowl games

References

External links
 1948 Bowl report from goldenrankings.com

1948–49 NCAA football bowl games
1948
Defunct college football bowls
1948
1948
College football bowls in Louisiana
Sports in Lafayette, Louisiana
December 1948 sports events in the United States
1948 in sports in Louisiana